Rajnota is a village in Kotputli tehsil in Jaipur district in the Indian state of Rajasthan.

Rajnota is the oldest and biggest village of Rajputs (kshatriyas) in Kotputli. This village has three gram panchayats (Rajnota, Kairodi and half of Karoli).

Rajnota is divided into approximately 500 dhani.

Rajnota is known as Soldier's village because 2000+ (on duty) Indian Army soldiers are garrisoned there.

Temples 
Shree Khem Sahab Maharaj temple is old and famous. Others include Hanuman Ji Temple, Shree Sati Mata Temple, Santoshi Mata Mandir, Rathod temple, Bajrangdas Baba temple, Khem Shaheb Baba mandir, Santoshi mata, the Hanuman ji statue of Kotputli, Radha Krishan Ji temple.

Climate 
Temperatures remain relatively high year-round, with the summer months of April to early July reaching . The monsoon brings frequent, heavy rains and thunderstorms, but flooding is not common. Occasional cold waves drop temperatures near freezing.

Education 
Five government and many private schools operate there. The village hosts a Government Senior Secondary School, Government Girls' School and Nav Jyoti Public Senior Secondary School,Sarvodya English Academy, Brilliant School Suryavanshi School, Bharti Sanskar School Rela, and Adarsh Gyan Mandir school.

Demographics 
At the 2011 India census, Rajnota had a population of 10,157. Hindi, Rajasthani and Marwari were the most common languages.

References

External links 
 yugalgupta

Villages in Jaipur district